Pallepfam (English: Destiny) is a 2014 Indian Meitei language film produced and directed by Wanglen Khundongbam. The film features Redy Yumnam, Leishangthem Tonthoi and Apsara Anoubam in the lead roles. The story of the film was written by Dr. Moirangthem Achumba. Pallepfam is Wanglen Khundongbam's debut film. The movie was selected in the 46th International Film Festival of India (IFFI) 2015 under the section New Horizon from the North East.

Pallepfam was among the 48 best feature films of Pan-Indian Cinema screened in the 10th Habitat Film Festival 2015. The film also opened at the second edition of Fragrances from the Northeast 2015, New Delhi, a three-day festival of cinema from the Northeast. It got official selection at the National Film Archive of India, Pune, 2015.

Synopsis
Ulen is a young and successful but unhappy man who shuttles between the polarities of two utterly different lives - one is the world of reality where he is rich and married to a beautiful girl, and the other is the world of his dream where he is poverty-stricken and married to a dedicated girl. The film portrays his self-realisation about the value of love and seeking happiness as he prioritizes the former over tangible materialism.

Cast
 Redy Yumnam as Ulen
 Leishangthem Tonthoi as Lembi
 Apsara Anoubam as Sana
 Ayekpam Shanti as Ulen's mother
 Venus
 Mukabala (Loya)
 Sagolsem Dhanamanjuri

Accolades

References

External links
 

2010s Meitei-language films
2014 films